St. John the Baptist Roman Catholic Church is a historic Roman Catholic church at 200 E. Main Street in Newark, New Castle County, Delaware. The first congregants of the church were Irish immigrants. The church was dedicated on June 24, 1883, replacing the previous structure built in the late 18th century, after the floor collapsed on Christmas Eve of 1880.  The church building is a one-story rectangular brick building with a central tower and three bays on the south front facade.

It was added to the National Register of Historic Places in 1982.

It is maintained and directed by the parish of St. John the Baptist-Holy Angels which houses another worship site at 82 Possum Park Road in Newark.

References

Irish-American culture in Delaware
Roman Catholic churches completed in 1883
19th-century Roman Catholic church buildings in the United States
Churches in the Roman Catholic Diocese of Wilmington
Churches in New Castle County, Delaware
Churches on the National Register of Historic Places in Delaware
National Register of Historic Places in New Castle County, Delaware
Buildings and structures in Newark, Delaware